The Los Rastros Formation is a Ladinian to Carnian fossiliferous formation of the Agua de la Peña Group in the Ischigualasto-Villa Unión Basin in northwestern Argentina. Fossil theropod tracks, as well as many insects, fossil fish of Myriolepis, bivalves and crustaceans and flora have been reported from the formation.

Description 
The formation overlies the Chañares Formation (and/or the Ischicuca Formation), and is overlain by the Ischigualasto Formation. The formation belongs to the Agua de la Peña Group of the Ischigualasto-Villa Unión Basin, where it is exposed in the Ischigualasto Provincial Park, a World Heritage Site in Argentina.

A CA-TIMS U-Pb zircon age of 234.47 ± 0.44 Ma from the lower Los Rastros Formation was published in 2020. The acquired age demonstrates that most of the overlying lacustrine strata within the basin were deposited during or after the Carnian Pluvial Event (CPE) that lasted from 237 to 227 Ma approximately.

Fossil content 
The following fossils among others have been recovered from the formation:

Fish
 Challaia elongata (Class Actinopterygii, Order Palaeonisciformes, Family Acrolepidae; formerly assigned to the genus Myriolepis) 
 Gualolepis carinaesquamosa (actinopterygian; possibly a member of the family Peipiaosteidae, making it a relative of sturgeons and paddlefish)
 Rastrolepis latipinnata (actinopterygian) 
 Rastrolepis riojaensis (actinopterygian) 
Insects
Blattoptera (cockroaches and their relatives)
 Argentinoblatta herbsti
 Argentinoblattula revelata
 Condorblatta lutzae
 Hermosablatta crassatella
 Hermosablatta pectinata
 Lariojablatta chanarensis
 Mancusoblatta pulchella
 Pulchellablatta nana
 Samaroblatta corrientesina
 Samaroblatta gualoensis
 Triassoblatta argentina

Coleoptera (beetles and their relatives)
 Argentinocupes pulcher
 Argentinosyne bonapartei
 Babuskaya elaterata
 Ischichucasyne cladocosta

Hemiptera (true bugs and their relatives)
 Saaloscytina carmonae

Unknown
 Miomina riojana

Crustaceans
 Lioestheria sp.
Bivalves
 Paleomutella sp.
Flora
 Calamitales
 Coniferales
 Cycadales
 Equisetales
 Osmundales
 Rhexoxilales
Ichnofossils
 Rigalites ischigualastensis
 Prestosuchidae

See also 
 List of dinosaur-bearing rock formations
 List of stratigraphic units with theropod tracks
 Chañares Formation
 Santa Maria Formation
 Omingonde Formation

References

Bibliography 
 
 
 
 
  
 
 

Geologic formations of Argentina
Triassic System of South America
Triassic Argentina
Carnian Stage
Shale formations
Sandstone formations
Deltaic deposits
Lacustrine deposits
Ichnofossiliferous formations
Ischigualasto-Villa Unión Basin
Fossiliferous stratigraphic units of South America
Paleontology in Argentina
Geology of La Rioja Province, Argentina
Geology of San Juan Province, Argentina